Mayor Democrito D. Plaza II Avenue (also known as the Butuan Bypass Road) is a 15.5-kilometre (9.6 mi), two-to-four lane national secondary highway in Butuan. It serves as a diversion road from the Butuan–Cagayan de Oro–Iligan Road.

This highway is designated as National Route 951 (N951) of the Philippine highway network.

This 15.5-kilometre highway was constructed along with the Macapagal Bridge which aims to decongest traffic along the Agusan-Misamis Oriental Road in downtown Butuan.

It was named after Democrito "Boy Daku" D. Plaza II, a former Barangay Captain from Baan, and city mayor of Butuan from 1992 to 2001 and 2004–2010.

Gallery

See also
Macapagal Bridge

References 

Roads in Agusan del Norte